The Turin International Book Fair is Italy's largest trade fair for books, held annually in mid-May in Turin, Italy.

Founded in 1988 as Book Showroom, it is one of the largest book fairs in Europe, involving more than 1,400 exhibitors and 341,000 visitors in 2015.

History 
It was founded in 1988 with the name Salone del Libro by the entrepreneur Guido Accornero and the bookseller Angelo Pezzana. The opening ceremony was held on May 18, 1988, at the opera house Teatro Regio, with the Nobel laureate Joseph Brodsky.

It has been held first at Torino Esposizioni and then, since 1992, at Lingotto Fiere.

From 1999 to 2009, because of disagreements with owner of the trade name Salone del Libro, the organization changed its name to Fiera del Libro (from 2002, Fiera Internazionale del Libro). Since 2010 it is called again Salone Internazionale del Libro.

From 1999 to 2016 the director has been the Italian writer Ernesto Ferrero, winner of the Strega Prize in 2000 with the novel N.

From October, 2016, the director is the Italian writer Nicola Lagioia, also winner of the Strega Prize in 2015 with the novel La ferocia (a.k.a. "The ferocity").

Guest of honour 
Every year a guest of honor is named for the fair. A special exhibition hall is set up for the guest country, and the major publishing houses are present at the fair.

See also
 Books in Italy

External links
 Official website

References

Recurring events established in 1988
Book fairs in Italy
International Book Fair
Trade fairs in Italy
Tourist attractions in Turin
1988 establishments in Italy
Annual events in Italy
Spring (season) events in Italy
Events in Turin